Qarxun, Yevlakh may refer to:
Aşağı Qarxun, Azerbaijan
Yuxarı Qarxun, Azerbaijan